The Western Sydney University School of Medicine is a constituent body of the College of Health and Science at Western Sydney University, Australia.

It became the third medical school offering degrees for medical practice in Sydney after The University of Sydney and The University of New South Wales. In 2007, the Bachelor of Medicine/Bachelor of Surgery (MBBS) degree was offered for the first time and in 2019, the Doctor of Medicine (MD) program was introduced to replace it.

Affiliated Hospitals
Clinical teaching of the School of Medicine is imparted at following medical hospitals:
Campbelltown Hospital
Macarthur Clinical School
Blacktown Hospital
Blacktown/Mt Druitt Clinical School
 Bathurst Base Hospital
Bathurst Clinical School
Lismore Base Hospital
Lismore Clinical School
Liverpool Hospital
Bankstown-Lidcombe Hospital
Fairfield Hospital

References

External links
 School of Medicine, University of Western Sydney
 University of Western Sydney Medical Society (UWSMS)

Medicine
Medical schools in Australia
Healthcare in Sydney